2,5-Dihydroxy-1,4-benzoquinone or 2,5-dihydroxy-para-benzoquinone is an organic compound with formula , formally derived from 1,4-benzoquinone by replacing two hydrogen atoms with hydroxyl (OH) groups.  It is one of seven dihydroxybenzoquinone isomers.  It is a yellow solid with planar molecules that exhibits ferroelectric properties.

The latter forms a variety of metal complexes, functioning as a binucleating ligand.

The compound has been identified as partly responsible for the color of aged cellulosic materials.

See also
 Hydroxy-1,4-benzoquinone
 Tetrahydroxy-1,4-benzoquinone

References

1,4-Benzoquinones
Hydroxybenzoquinones